Amphidromus sumatranus is a species of air-breathing land snail, a terrestrial pulmonate gastropod mollusc in the family Camaenidae.

Distribution 
This species is found in Sumatra Island, Indonesia.

References 

sumatranus
Gastropods described in 1864